There are 26 state roads that are shorter than  long in the U.S. state of New Mexico that are maintained by the New Mexico Department of Transportation. The shortest, State Road 446, is a quarter-mile (402 m) long and serves to connect Valmora to State Road 97. State Road 597, the second shortest highway, links U.S. Route 160 to the Four Corners Monument, a tourist destination on the Navajo Nation where the states of Utah, Arizona, New Mexico, and Colorado meet.

State Road 99

State Road 99 (NM 99) was a very short state highway located entirely in Albuquerque. The highway began at Central Avenue (former US 66) and ended at the Johnson Gym within the University of New Mexico. The exact dates of existence are unknown.

State Road 106

The highway begins at a four way intersection with concurrent U.S. Route 84 (US 84 ) / US 285 and NM 399. The highway travels north through Sombrillo, over the Santa Cruz River to a t-intersection with NM 76.

State Road 138

The highway begins at a four-way intersection with NM 478 and Watson Lane, traveling eastbound on Tortugas Drive to an intersection with Espina Street. The highway turns north and terminates at Stern Drive just east of Interstate 10.

State Road 144

The highway begins at an intersection with NM 65 and ends at the Camp Luna Technical Vocational Institute.

State Road 158

The highway begins at an intersection with NM 185 and travels northeast along Lujan Hill Road to its eastern terminus at Doña Ana Road. The roadway continues east as County Highway D053.

State Road 177

The highway forms a loop from NM 51 near the Elephant Butte Lake State Park. NM 177 is the southern terminus of NM 195.

State Road 183

The highway's western terminus is at NM 28 north of La Union and the eastern terminus is at the end of state maintenance as a continuation of Vinton Road towards the Texas/ New Mexico border. NM 183 was formally part of NM 273.

State Road 184

The highway's western terminus is at NM 273 south of Las Cruces and the eastern terminus is a continuation as Country Club Road at the Texas/ New Mexico border in Santa Teresa.

State Road 233

The highway begins at a t-intersection with US 84, northeasterly over the Chama River before terminating at County Road 142 south of Medanales.

State Road 286

The southern terminus is at FR 4118, and the northern terminus is at the end of state maintenance.

State Road 305

The southern terminus is at the end of state maintenance at the Rio Arriba/ Sandoval County line, and the northern terminus is at NM 595. The portion from NM 96 in Regina to the Rio Arriba/ Sandoval County line was transferred to Sandoval County on October 3, 1988 in a road exchange agreement.

State Road 315

The highways western terminus is at NM 313, it then begins traveling east intersecting I-25 and US 85 before reaching the eastern terminus at FR 2532.

State Road 327

The highway begins at the BNSF Railway line along Isleta Lake Road, traveling east to its terminus at NM 47, just south of Interstate 25.

State Road 395

The highway begins at the south abutment of the Rio Hondo bridge, and travels north to an intersection with concurrent U.S. Routes 70 and 380.

State Road 414

The highway begins at US 285 in Ojo Caliente, and travels west to the end of state maintenance.

State Road 446

The highway is the shortest state road in New Mexico. The highway begins at a t-intersection with NM 97, and parallels Wolf Creek before terminating just south of Valmora.

State Road 450

The highway begins at a t-intersection with NM 97, before terminating at the end of State maintenance.

State Road 461

The western terminus is at US 54 north of Carrizozo, and the eastern terminus is at the end of route in Coyote.

State Road 473

The highway begins at exit 240 off of Interstate 25 traveling northwest along Bernalillo Avenue over a level crossing to an intersection with NM 313 in downtown Bernalillo.

State Road 498

The highway begins at an intersection with NM 273 northeast as Racetrack Drive, over the Rio Grande before terminating at the New Mexico–Texas state line.

State Road 513

The highway begins at a junction with U.S. Route 60 and travels north to the Salinas Pueblo Missions National Monument east of Scholle.

State Road 533

The highway begins at the Arizona–New Mexico state border on Portal Road, east to an intersection with NM 80.

State Road 546

The highway begins at a four way intersection in southeast Derry. The highway begins at NM 187 and travels northeast to an intersection with exit 51 on Interstate 25.

State Road 576

The highway begins at an intersection with NM 111 and travels west to the national forest boundary.

State Road 581

The highway begins at an intersection with NM 369 and travels southeasterly to its eastern terminus at NM 399.

State Road 597

The highway begins at an intersection with U.S. Route 160 in the south, and heads northwest to the Four Corners Monument.

State Road 615

The highway begins at Victor Avenue, and proceeds northwesterly through an interchange with Interstate 40 to the highways eastern terminus at NM 122.

State Road 2001

The highway began at Scenic Drive and ended at the New Mexico Museum of Space History. NM 2001 was one of the few "orphan" routes in the State Road system, as it did not connect to any other State Road. The number appears to be a reference to the book 2001: A Space Odyssey by Arthur C. Clarke. The exact dates of existence are unknown, but the highway was established in the 1990s and the signage remained present as of 2008. The only hints to NM 2001 being retired is the absence of the route from current NMDOT highway logs. The official website for the Space Museum still lists its address at "Highway 2001".

See also

List of longest state highways in the United States

References

State Roads
 
New Mexico